Nostalgia is a solo album by Czech musician Ivan Kral, former member of Patti Smith Group. It was released in 1995 by BMG Ariola label and it was produced by Kral himself. It features guest appearances by Patti Smith and John Cale from the Velvet Underground.

In 1995 Kral won an Czech Academy of Popular Music award for this album as Best Producer and it was also awarded for Best Album Cover.

Kral admires the black/white photography of Czech photographer František Drtikol (1883 – 1961). The Drtikol estate curator, Anna Fárová, provided use of Drtikol photos to Kral for visuals in the CD. Kral’s video for the single, “Winner Takes All”, is a re-creation of an imagined Drtikol photo session and includes restored footage.

Track listing

Personnel
 Ivan Kral − vocals, guitars, bass guitar, keyboards
 Andrej Šeban − guitars, keyboards
 Emil Frátrik − drums
 Marek Minárik − bass guitar
 Patti Smith − voice on "Perfect Moon"
 John Cale − piano on "Perfect Moon"
Technical
Ivan Minárik - recording, mixing
Martin Brass, Steve King - recording on "Perfect Moon"
František Drtikol - cover photography from a film study

References 

1995 albums
Ivan Kral albums
Albums produced by Ivan Kral